Dan Healey (born March 21, 1957) is a Canadian and English historian, Slavist. He is a pioneer of the study of the history of homosexuality in Russia.

In 1981 he graduated with a bachelor's degree in Russian Language and Literature at the University of Toronto. In the 1980s he worked in the tourism industry in Canada, Great Britain, and the USSR. In the 1990s, he returned to academia and in 1998 completed the Ph.D. at the University of Toronto.

Healey taught at the University of Swansea (2000-2011), at the University of Reading (2011-2013), at St Antony's College of the Oxford University (from 2013).

His book Homosexual Desire in Revolutionary Russia (2001) won the second place of the Gladstone Prize of the Royal Historical Society.

His scholarly interests include the history of LGBT people of Russia, Russian and Soviet medicine and psychiatry, Russian and Soviet penitentiary institutions, GULAG.

Bibliography 
 Homosexual Desire in Revolutionary Russia: The Regulation of Sexual and Gender Dissent. Chicago: University Of Chicago Press, 2001. — 376 p. — , 
 Гомосексуальное влечение в революционной России: регулирование сексуально-гендерного диссидентства / науч. ред. Л. В. Бессмертных, Ю. А. Михайлов, пер. с англ. Т .Ю. Логачева. В. И. Новиков. — Москва: НИЦ «Ладомир», 2008. — 624 p. — (Русская потаенная литература). — .
 Bolshevik Sexual Forensics: Diagnosing Disorder in the Clinic and Courtroom, 1917-1939. DeKalb: Northern Illinois University Press, 2009. — 260 p. — .
 Editor, with Frances L. Bernstein and Christopher Burton. Soviet Medicine: Culture, Practice, and Science. DeKalb: Northern Illinois University Press, 2013. — 312 p. — .
 Editor, with Barbara Evans Clements and Rebecca Friedman. Russian Masculinities in History and Culture. New York: Palgrave Macmillan, 2002. — 255 p. — .
 Russian Homophobia from Stalin to Sochi. London: Bloomsbury Academic, 2017. — 272 p. — .

Literature

References

External links 
 Professor Dan Healey. School of Interdisciplinary Area Studies. University of Oxford.
 Professor Dan Healey. St Antony's College.

Living people
LGBT studies academics
Historians of LGBT topics
Historians of Russia
LGBT in Russia
Fellows of St Antony's College, Oxford
University of Toronto alumni
1957 births